Crime Without Passion is a 1934 American drama film directed by Ben Hecht and Charles MacArthur and starring Claude Rains. It is the first of four pictures written, produced and directed by Hecht and MacArthur for Paramount Pictures. Sixty to seventy percent of the film was directed by cinematographer Lee Garmes.

Plot
The plot centers around a clever and suave but unscrupulous and dishonest lawyer Lee Gentry (Rains) who boasts that he "lives by lies". His attempts to finish his affair with a clinging, besotted cabaret artist do not go according to plan.

Cast

Critical reception
In The New York Times, Mordaunt Hall found "a drama blessed with marked originality and photographed with consummate artistry," and cited one of its many pluses as "that of having Claude Rains in the main rôle."

Bibliography
 Eames, John Douglas, The Paramount Story, London: Octopus Books, 1985

References

External links

"Crime without Passion (1934). Three stars." Review and film synopsis at wordpress.com
"The Furies," opening montage sequence of Crime Without Passion, special effects by Slavko Vorkapich

1934 films
1934 crime drama films
American black-and-white films
1930s English-language films
Paramount Pictures films
American crime drama films
Films with screenplays by Ben Hecht
Films with screenplays by Charles MacArthur
Films directed by Ben Hecht
1930s American films